The 2008 São Paulo municipal election took place in the city of São Paulo, with the first round taking place on 5 October and the second round taking place on 26 October 2008. Voters voted to elect the Mayor, the Vice Mayor, and 55 City Councillors for the administration of the city. The result was a 2nd round victory for incumbent Mayor Gilberto Kassab of the Democrats (DEM), who had previously assumed office after the resignation of José Serra, who went to run for governor in the 2006 São Paulo gubernatorial election., winning 3,790,558 votes and a share of 60,72% of the popular vote, defeating Marta Suplicy, of the Worker's Party (PT), who took 2,452,527 votes and a share of 39,28% of the popular vote.

Candidates

Candidates in runoff

Candidates failing to make runoff

Results

Mayor

City Councillors

References 

2008
October 2008 events in South America
São Paulo